was a Japanese diplomat who served as vice-consul for the Japanese Empire in Kaunas, Lithuania. During the Second World War, Sugihara helped thousands of Jews flee Europe by issuing transit visas to them so that they could travel through Japanese territory, risking his job and the lives of his family. The fleeing Jews were refugees from German-occupied Western Poland and Soviet-occupied Eastern Poland, as well as residents of Lithuania. In 1985, the State of Israel honored Sugihara as one of the Righteous Among the Nations for his actions. He is the only Japanese national to have been so honored. The year 2020 was "The Year Chiune Sugihara" in Lithuania. It has been estimated as many as 100,000 people alive today are the descendants of the recipients of Sugihara visas.

Early life and education
Chiune Sugihara was born on 1 January 1900 (Meiji 33), in Mino, Gifu prefecture, to a middle-class father, and an upper-middle class mother, . When he was born, his father worked at a tax office in Kozuchi-town and his family lived in a borrowed temple, with the Buddhist temple  where he was born nearby. He was the second son among five boys and one girl. His father and family moved into the tax office within the branch of the Nagoya Tax Administration Office one after another. In 1903 (Meiji 36) his family moved to Asahi Village in Niu-gun, Fukui Prefecture. In 1904 (Meiji 37) they moved to Yokkaichi, Mie Prefecture. On 25 October 1905 (Meiji 38), they moved to Nakatsu Town, Ena-gun, Gifu Prefecture. In 1906 (Meiji 39) on 2 April, Chiune entered Nakatsu Town Municipal Elementary School (now Nakatsugawa City Minami Elementary School in Gifu Prefecture). On 31 March 1907 (Meiji 40), he transferred to Kuwana Municipal Kuwana Elementary School in Mie Prefecture (currently Kuwana Municipal Nissin Elementary School). In December of that same year, he transferred to Nagoya Municipal Furuwatari Elementary School (now Nagoya Municipal Heiwa Elementary School). In 1912, he graduated with top honors from Furuwatari Elementary School and entered Aichi prefectural 5th secondary school (now Zuiryo high school), a combined junior and senior high school. His father wanted him to become a physician, but Chiune deliberately failed the entrance exam by writing only his name on the exam papers. Instead, he entered Waseda University in 1918 (Taishō 7) and majored in English language. At that time, he entered Yuai Gakusha, the Christian fraternity that had been founded by Baptist pastor Harry Baxter Benninhof, to improve his English.

In 1919 (Taishō 8), he passed the Foreign Ministry Scholarship exam. From 1920 to 1922 (Taishō 9 to 11), Sugihara served in the Imperial Army as a second lieutenant with the 79th Infantry, stationed in Korea, then part of the Empire of Japan. He resigned his commission in November 1922 and took the Foreign Ministry's language qualifying exams the following year, passing the Russian exam with distinction. The Japanese Foreign Ministry recruited him and assigned him to Harbin, China, where he also studied the Russian and German languages and later became an expert on Russian affairs.

Manchurian Foreign Office
When Sugihara served in the Manchurian Foreign Office, he took part in the negotiations with the Soviet Union concerning the Northern Manchurian Railroad.

During his time in Harbin, Sugihara married Klaudia Semionovna Apollonova and converted to Christianity (Russian Orthodox Church), using the baptismal name Sergei Pavlovich.

In 1934, Sugihara quit his post as Deputy Foreign Minister in Manchuria in protest over Japanese mistreatment of the local Chinese.

Sugihara and his wife divorced in 1935, before he returned to Japan, where he married Yukiko (1913–2008, née Kikuchi). After the marriage; they had four sons - Hiroki, Chiaki, Haruki, and Nobuki. As of 2021, Nobuki is the only surviving son and represents the Sugihara family.

Chiune Sugihara also served in the Information Department of the Ministry of Foreign Affairs and as a translator for the Japanese delegation in Helsinki, Finland.

Lithuania

In 1939, Sugihara became a vice-consul of the Japanese Consulate in Kaunas, Lithuania. His duties included reporting on Soviet and German troop movements, and to find out if Germany planned an attack on the Soviets and, if so, to report the details of this attack to his superiors in Berlin and Tokyo.

Sugihara had cooperated with Polish intelligence as part of a bigger Japanese–Polish cooperative plan.

In Lithuania, Sugihara started using the Sino-Japanese reading "Sempo" for his given name, since it was easier to pronounce than "Chiune".

Jewish refugees
As the Soviet Union occupied sovereign Lithuania in 1940, many Jewish refugees from Poland (Polish Jews) as well as Lithuanian Jews tried to acquire exit visas. Without the visas, it was dangerous to travel, yet it was impossible to find countries willing to issue them. Hundreds of refugees came to the Japanese consulate in Kaunas, trying to get a visa to Japan. At the time, on the brink of the war, Lithuanian Jews made up one third of Lithuania's urban population and half of the residents of every town. In the period between 16 July and 3 August 1940, the Dutch Honorary Consul Jan Zwartendijk provided over 2,200 Jews with official third destination passes to Curaçao, a Caribbean island and Dutch colony that required no entry visa, or to Surinam.

European Jewish refugees began to arrive in Japan in July 1940 and departed by September 1941. An overview during this period is described in the Annual Reports of 1940 and 1941 by the American Jewish Joint Distribution Committee (JDC).

In June 1940, Italy entered into the war and the Mediterranean route was closed. The Committee in Great Germany, forced to seek new outlets for emigration, arranged for the transportation of Jews from Germany across Europe and Asia (via the trans-Siberian railway) to Vladivostok, thence to Japan. From Japan the refugees were to embark for destinations in the Western Hemisphere.

On December 31, 1940, the Soviet Union declared that all persons residing in Lithuania as of September 1, 1940, had the right to apply for Soviet citizenship. While the great bulk of Polish refugees in Lithuania opted for Soviet citizenship, there was a group of 4,000–5,000 persons for whom the New Order offered little opportunity. These were principally rabbis, yeshiva students, members of the intellectual classes and leaders of various Jewish communal and labor organizations. Most of them immediately applied for exit permits from Lithuania. Although during the early weeks of 1941 exit permits and Japanese transit visas were readily granted, the problem was how to find money for transportation costs for those people whose very existences were jeopardized if they remained in Lithuania. The JDC, in collaboration with a number of other American Jewish groups, contributed toward the funds required for the Trans-Siberian trip to Japan of 1,700 persons.

In July 1940, Jewish refugees from Germany and other countries began arriving in Japan at Tsuruga, Shimonoseki and Kobe. Japanese embassies and consulates except Kaunas issued 3,448 Japanese transit visas from January 1940 to March 1941. Most of the recipients held valid end-visas and immediately departed Japan. Starting in October 1940, Polish refugees from Lithuania began to land on Tsuruga. Their number increased sharply from January 1941 onwards. "By the end of March there were close to 2,000 in the country, mostly in Kobe. More than half of these refugees did not hold valid end-visas and were unable to proceed further than Japan." They were forced to stay for a long time to find immigration countries.

The number of Jewish refugees who came to Japan, as seen in Table 1, has been documented as 4,500, 5,000 or 6,000. The 552 persons noted in the second row of the table do not match the number of departing persons edited by Jewcom. The Siberian railway had been closed and no evidence supporting this figure is found in JDC annual reports or MOFA documents. For the 200 persons described in Note 1 of Table 1, there is a document in the Archives of MOFA that the Japanese consulate of Vladivostok transferred about 50 Jewish refugees who had been stranded in Vladivostok to Shanghai with Soviet Union cargo on April 26, 1941.

Sugihara's visas
At the time, the Japanese government required that visas be issued only to those who had gone through appropriate immigration procedures and had enough funds. Most of the refugees did not fulfill these criteria. Sugihara dutifully contacted the Japanese Foreign Ministry three times for instructions. Each time, the Ministry responded that anybody granted a visa should have a visa to a third destination to exit Japan, with no exceptions.

Being aware that applicants were in danger if they stayed behind, Sugihara decided to ignore his orders and, from 18 July to 28 August 1940, issued ten-day visas to Jews for transit through Japan. Given his inferior post and the culture of the Japanese Foreign Service bureaucracy, this was an unusual act of disobedience. He spoke to Soviet officials who agreed to let the Jews travel through the country via the Trans-Siberian Railway at five times the standard ticket price.

Sugihara continued to hand-write visas, reportedly spending 18 to 20 hours a day on them, producing a normal month's worth of visas each day, until 4 September, when he had to leave his post before the consulate was closed. By that time, he had granted thousands of visas to Jews, many of whom were heads of households and thus permitted to take their families with them. It is claimed that before he left, he handed the official consulate stamp to a refugee so that more visas could be forged. His son, Nobuki Sugihara, adamantly insisted in an interview with Ann Curry that his father never gave the stamp to anyone. According to witnesses, he was still writing visas while in transit from his hotel and after boarding the train at the Kaunas Railway Station, throwing visas into the crowd of desperate refugees out of the train's window even as the train pulled out.

In final desperation, blank sheets of paper with only the consulate seal and his signature (that could be later written over into a visa) were hurriedly prepared and flung out from the train. As he prepared to depart, he said, "Please forgive me. I cannot write anymore. I wish you the best." When he bowed deeply to the people before him, someone exclaimed, "Sugihara. We'll never forget you. I'll surely see you again!"

Sugihara himself wondered about official reaction to the thousands of visas he issued. Many years later, he recalled, "No one ever said anything about it. I remember thinking that they probably didn't realize how many I actually issued."

Numbers saved
On the number of refugees passing through Japan who held Japanese transit visas for Curaçao issued by Sugihara, the so-called "Sugihara visa", there are two documents stating numbers of 2,200 and 6,000. The 6,000 persons as stated in Visas for Life is likely hearsay.

K. Watanabe argued that there could be 6,000, arguing that use by three family members per visa is reasonable, that there were newspaper articles reporting the 6,000 figure, and that most of the refugees landing on Tsuruga were now admitted with a Sugihara visa. On September 29, 1983, Fuji Television aired a documentary "One visa that decided their fate - the Japanese who saved 4,500 Jews."

In 1985, when Chiune Sugihara received the Righteous among the Nations award, some Japanese newspapers reported that he saved 6,000 people and others 4,500. The Japan Times, dated January 19, 1985, had the headline "Japanese Man honored for saving 6,000 Jews", and reported "Sugihara defied orders from Tokyo and issued transit visas to nearly 6,000 Jews". US newspapers referred to Sugihara as 'a diplomat who defied his government's orders and issued transit visas for 6,000 Jews.

Table 2 shows the number of refugees who had stayed at Kobe in 1941 based on Archives of MOFA. Refugees classified as "No visa" in the table are presumed to have held fakes of Japanese transit visas issued by Sugihara. The Soviets wanted to purge Polish refugees who had been stranded in Soviet territory with Japanese transit visas as soon as possible, and so permitted them to get on the train to Vladivostok with or without a destination visa. The Japanese government was forced to admit them. On April 8, 1941, of the 1,400 Polish Jews staying at Kobe, about 1,300 were "for Curaçao" or "No visa".

The Polish ambassador in Tokyo, Tadeusz Romer, remembered, "They (Polish refugees) only had fictitious Dutch visas for the island of Curaçao and Japanese transit visas." According to the refugee name list surveyed by Fukui Prefecture, of the 306 persons who landed at Tsuruga Port in October 1940, there were 203 Poles. Their destinations were US 89, Palestine 46, Curaçao 24, and others. It is estimated that about 80% of them were on the Sugihara visa list. The documents of the United States Holocaust Memorial Museum and "Refugee and Survivor" do not mention the number of people saved by a "Sugihara visa".

More than half of the refugees who entered with invalid visas, including a "Sugihara visa", obtained valid visas with the help of JDC, HIAS, the Embassy of Poland, and the Japanese government, and embarked for host countries. In August–September 1941, Japanese authorities transferred about 850 refugees stranded in Japan to Shanghai before Japan and the United States began war. According to Emigration Table by Jewcom, the number of Polish refugees leaving Japan for various destinations was Shanghai 860, US 532, Canada 186, Palestine 186, Australia 81, South Africa 59, and others 207, in total 2,111.

The total number of Jews saved by Sugihara is in dispute, with estimates around 6,000; family visas—which allowed several people to travel on one visa—were also issued, which would account for the much higher figure. The Simon Wiesenthal Center has estimated that Chiune Sugihara issued transit visas for about 6,000 Jews and that around 40,000 descendants of the Jewish refugees are alive today because of his actions. Polish intelligence produced some false visas. Sugihara's widow and eldest son estimate that he saved 10,000 Jews from certain death, whereas Boston University professor and author Hillel Levine also estimates that he helped "as many as 10,000 people", but that far fewer people ultimately survived. Indeed, some Jews who received Sugihara's visas failed to leave Lithuania in time, were later captured by the Germans who invaded the Soviet Union on 22 June 1941, and perished in the Holocaust.

The Diplomatic Record Office of the Ministry of Foreign Affairs has opened to the public two documents concerning Sugihara's file: the first aforementioned document is a 5 February 1941 diplomatic note from Chiune Sugihara to Japan's then Foreign Minister Yōsuke Matsuoka in which Sugihara stated he issued 1,500 out of 2,139 transit visas to Jews and Poles; however, since most of the 2,139 people were not Jewish, this would imply that most of the visas were given to Polish Jews instead. Levine then notes that another document from the same foreign office file "indicates an additional 3,448 visas were issued in Kaunas for a total of 5,580 visas" which were likely given to Jews desperate to flee Lithuania for safety in Japan or Japanese occupied-China.

Many refugees used their visas to travel across the Soviet Union to Vladivostok and then by boat to Kobe, Japan, where there was a Jewish community. Romer, the Polish ambassador in Tokyo, organized help for them. From August 1940 to November 1941, he had managed to get transit visas in Japan, asylum visas to Canada, Australia, New Zealand, and Burma, immigration certificates to British Mandatory Palestine, and immigrant visas to the United States and some Latin American countries for more than two thousand Polish-Lithuanian Jewish refugees, who arrived in Kobe, Japan, and the Shanghai Ghetto, China.

The remaining number of Sugihara survivors stayed in Japan until they were deported to Japanese-held Shanghai, where there was already a large Jewish community that had existed as early as the mid-1930s. Some took the route through Korea directly to Shanghai without passing through Japan. A group of thirty people, all possessing a visa of "Jakub Goldberg", were shuttled back and forth on the open sea for several weeks before finally being allowed to pass through Tsuruga. Most of the around 20,000 Jews survived the Holocaust in the Shanghai ghetto until the Japanese surrender in 1945, three to four months following the collapse of the Third Reich itself.

Imprisonment, release and forced resignation

Sugihara was reassigned to Königsberg, East Prussia before serving as a Consul General in Prague, in the German-occupied Protectorate of Bohemia and Moravia, from March 1941 to late 1942 and in the legation in Bucharest, Romania from 1942 to 1944. He was promoted to the rank of third secretary in 1943, and was decorated with the Order of the Sacred Treasure, 5th Class, in 1944. When Soviet troops entered Romania, they imprisoned Sugihara and his family in a POW camp for eighteen months. They were released in 1946 and returned to Japan through the Soviet Union via the Trans-Siberian railroad and Nakhodka port. In 1947, the Japanese foreign office asked him to resign, nominally due to downsizing. Some sources, including his wife Yukiko Sugihara, have said that the Foreign Ministry told Sugihara he was dismissed because of "that incident" in Lithuania.

Later life
Sugihara settled in Fujisawa in Kanagawa prefecture with his wife and three sons. To support his family he took a series of menial jobs, at one point selling light bulbs door to door. He suffered a personal tragedy in 1947 when his youngest son, Haruki, died at the age of seven, shortly after their return to Japan. In 1949 they had one more son, Nobuki, who is the last son alive representing the Chiune Sugihara Family, residing in Belgium. 
Chiune Sugihara later began to work for an export company as general manager of a U.S. Military Post Exchange. Utilizing his command of the Russian language, Sugihara went on to work and live a low-key existence in the Soviet Union for sixteen years, while his family stayed in Japan.

In 1968, Yehoshua Nishri, an economic attaché to the Israeli Embassy in Tokyo and one of the Sugihara beneficiaries, finally located and contacted him. Nishri had been a Polish teen in the 1940s. The next year Sugihara visited Israel and was greeted by the Israeli government. Sugihara beneficiaries began to lobby for his recognition by Yad Vashem. In 1984, Yad Vashem recognised him as Righteous Among the Nations (translit. Khasidei Umot ha-Olam). Sugihara was too ill to travel to Israel, so his wife and youngest son Nobuki accepted the honor on his behalf.

In 1985, 45 years after the Soviet invasion of Lithuania, he was asked his reasons for issuing visas to the Jews. Sugihara explained that the refugees were human beings, and that they simply needed help.

When asked by Moshe Zupnik why he risked his career to save other people, he said simply: "I do it just because I have pity on the people. They want to get out so I let them have the visas."

Chiune Sugihara died at a hospital in Kamakura, on 31 July 1986. Despite the publicity given him in Israel and other nations, he had remained virtually unknown in his home country. Only when a large Jewish delegation from around the world, including the Israeli ambassador to Japan, attended his funeral, did his neighbours find out what he had done. His subsequent considerable posthumous acclaim contrasts with the obscurity in which he lived following the loss of his diplomatic career.

Honor restored

His death spotlighted his humanitarian acts during WW2 and created the opportunity to revise his reputation as a diplomat in his own country. In 1991 Muneo Suzuki, Parliamentary Vice-President of Foreign Affairs, apologized to Chiune's family for the long-time unfair treatments of Ministry of Foreign Affairs. Official honor restoration by Japanese Government was made on October 10, 2000, when Foreign Minister Yohei Kono set the award plaque and gave a commendation speech at the ceremony for Sugihara at Diplomatic Archives.

Family

 Yukiko Sugihara (née Kikuchi) (1913–2008) – wife. Poet and author of Visas for 6,000 Lives. She was the eldest daughter of high school principal in Kagawa Prefecture, and the granddaughter of a Buddhist priest in Iwate Prefecture. She was also well versed in German, and a member of Kanagawa Prefecture Poetry Committee and Selection Committee for Asahi Shimbun's Kadan poetry section. She was the author of Poetry Anthology: White Nights and other works. She also converted to Russian Orthodoxy upon her marriage to Sugihara. Died on October 8, 2008
 Hiroki Sugihara (1936–2002) – eldest son. Studied in California upon graduating from Shonan High School in Kanagawa Prefecture in Japan. Translated his mother's book Visas for Life into English.
 Chiaki Sugihara (1938–2010) – second son. Born in Helsinki. Studied in California.
 Haruki Sugihara (1940–12 November 1947) – third son. He was born in Kaunas. Died in Japan aged between six and seven of leukemia.
 Nobuki Sugihara (1948–) – fourth son. Attended Hebrew University in Israel in 1968 at the invitation of the Israeli Foreign Ministry and the Jewish Fund. Represents the Sugihara family as the only surviving son of Chiune. Since his attendance at the award ceremony of the Sugihara Righteous Forest in the outskirt of Jerusalem on behalf of Chiune in 1985, Nobuki has been actively attending Chiune-related events around the world as the family's spokesperson. Nobuki also heads NPO Sugihara, registered in Belgium, in order to promote peace in the Middle East.
 Grandchildren: Chiune Sugihara had 9 grandchildren (8 still alive) and 9 great-grandchildren.

Legacy and honors

Sugihara Street in Vilnius, Lithuania, Chiune (Sempo) Sugihara Street in Jaffa, Israel, and the asteroid 25893 Sugihara are named after him.

In 1992, the town of Yaotsu opened the Park of Humanity, on a hill over looking the town. In 2000, the Sugihara Chiune Memorial Hall was opened to the public. Since its establishment, more than 600,000 visitors, Japanese and foreign, visited and studied about Sugihara and his virtue.

A corner for Sugihara Chiune is set up in the Port of Humanity Tsuruga Museum near Tsuruga Port, the place where many Jewish refugees arrived in Japan, in the city of Tsuruga, Fukui, Japan.

The Sugihara House Museum is in Kaunas, Lithuania. The Conservative synagogue Temple Emeth, in Chestnut Hill, Massachusetts, US, built a "Sugihara Memorial Garden" and holds an Annual Sugihara Memorial Concert.

When Sugihara's widow Yukiko traveled to Jerusalem in 1998, she was met by tearful survivors who showed her the yellowing visas that her husband had signed. A park in Jerusalem is named after him. Sugihara appeared on a 1998 Israeli postage stamp. The Japanese government honored him on the centennial of his birth in 2000.

In 2001, a sakura park with 200 trees was planted in Vilnius, Lithuania, to mark the 100th anniversary of Sugihara.

In 2002, a memorial statue of Chiune Sugihara by Ramon G. Velazco titled "Chiune Sugihara Memorial, Hero of the Holocaust" was installed in the Little Tokyo neighborhood of Los Angeles, California, US.  The life-size bronze statue depicts Sugihara seated on a bench and holding a hand-written visa.  Adjacent to the statue is a granite boulder with dedication plaques and a quotation from the Talmud: "He who saves one life, saves the entire world."  Its dedication was attended by consuls from Japan, Israel and Lithuania, Los Angeles city officials and Sugihara's son, Chiaki Sugihara.  In 2015 the statue sustained vandalism damage to its surface.

In 2007 he was posthumously awarded the Commander's Cross with the Star of the Order of Polonia Restituta, and the Commander's Cross Order of Merit of the Republic of Poland by the President of Poland in 1996. Also, in 1993, he was awarded the Life Saving Cross of Lithuania.
He was posthumously awarded the Sakura Award by the Japanese Canadian Cultural Centre (JCCC) in Toronto in November 2014.

In June 2016, a street in Netanya, Israel, was named for Sugihara in the presence of his son Nobuki, as a number of Netanya's current residents are descendants of the Lithuanian Jews who had been given a means of escaping the Third Reich.
There is also a street named Rua Cônsul Chiune Sugihara in Londrina, Brazil.

The Lithuanian government declared 2020 "The Year of Chiune Sugihara", promising to erect a monument to him and issue postage stamps in his honor. A monument to Sugihara, featuring origami cranes, was unveiled in Kaunas in October 2020.

Since October 2021, there is a Chiune Sugihara Square in Jerusalem as well as a Garden named for him in the Kiryat Hayovel neighborhood of the city.

Biographies

 
 Yukiko Sugihara, Visas for Life, translated by Hiroki Sugihara, San Francisco, Edu-Comm, 1995.
 Yukiko Sugihara, Visas pour 6000 vies, traduit par Karine Chesneau, Ed. Philippe Picquier, 1995.
 A Japanese TV station in Japan made a documentary film about Chiune Sugihara. This film was shot in Kaunas, at the place of the former embassy of Japan.
 Sugihara: Conspiracy of Kindness (2000) from PBS shares details of Sugihara and his family and the fascinating relationship between the Jews and the Japanese in the 1930s and 1940s.
 A Special Fate: Chiune Sugihara: Hero of the Holocaust (2000), by Alison Leslie Gold, is a book for young readers (grades 5-10). The book draws on interviews with Sugihara's wife and other witnesses and weaves in the stories of two Jewish refugee families. The epilogue describes how Sugihara was finally honored in his own country and in Israel.
 On 11 October 2005, Yomiuri TV (Osaka) aired a two-hour-long drama entitled Visas for Life about Sugihara, based on his wife's book.
 Chris Tashima and Chris Donahue made a film about Sugihara in 1997, Visas and Virtue, which won the Academy Award for Live Action Short Film.
 A 2002 children's picture book, Passage to Freedom: The Sugihara Story, by Ken Mochizuki and illustrated by Dom Lee, is written from the perspective of Sugihara's young sons and in the voice of Hiroki Sugihara (age 5, at the time). The book also includes an afterword written by Hiroki Sugihara.
 In 2015, Japanese fictional drama film Persona Non Grata was produced, Toshiaki Karasawa played Sugihara.

Notable people helped by Sugihara
 Leaders and students of the Mir Yeshiva, Yeshivas Tomchei Temimim (formally of Lubavitch/Lyubavichi, Russia) relocated to Otwock, Poland and elsewhere.
 Yaakov Banai, commander of the Lehi movement's combat unit and later an Israeli military commander.
 Joseph R. Fiszman, a noted scholar and Professor Emeritus of Political Science at the University of Oregon.
 Robert Lewin, a Polish art dealer and philanthropist.
 Leo Melamed, financier, head of the Chicago Mercantile Exchange (CME), and pioneer of financial futures.
 John G. Stoessinger, professor of diplomacy at the University of San Diego.
 Zerach Warhaftig, an Israeli lawyer and politician, and a signatory of Israel's Declaration of Independence.
 George Zames, control theorist
 Bernard and Rochelle Zell, parents of business magnate Sam Zell

See also
 Individuals and groups assisting Jews during the Holocaust
 Aristides de Sousa Mendes
 Ho Feng-shan
 Varian Fry
 Tatsuo Osako
 Setsuzo Kotsuji
 Giorgio Perlasca
 John Rabe
 Abdol Hossein Sardari
 Oskar Schindler
 Raoul Wallenberg
 Nicholas Winton
 Jan Zwartendijk
 Persona Non Grata (2015 film)
 Nansen passport
 Ładoś Group

References

Further reading

 Chapman, J.W.M., "Japan in Poland's Secret Neighbourhood War" in Japan Forum No. 2, 1995.
 
 
 Goldstein, Jonathan, "The Case of Jan Zwartendijk in Lithuania, 1940" in Deffry M. Diefendorf (ed.), New Currents in Holocaust Research, Lessons and Legacies, vol. VI, Northwestern University Press, 2004.
 
 Johnstone, George "Japan's Sugihara came to Jews' rescue during WWII" in Investor's Business Daily, 8 December 2011.
 Kaplan, Vivian Jeanette, Ten Green Bottles: The True Story of One Family's Journey from War-torn Austria to the Ghettos of Shanghai (St. Martin's Press, 2004) 
 Kaplan, William, One More Border: The True Story of One Family's Escape from War-Torn Europe, 
 
 Krebs, Gerhard, NOAG 175–176, 2004.
 Krebs, Gerhard, "The Jewish Problem in Japanese-German Relations 1933–1945" in Bruce Reynolds (ed.), Japan in Fascist Era, New York, 2004.
 Mitsui Hideko, "Longing for the Other : traitors' cosmopolitanism" in Social Anthropology, Vol 18, Issue 4, November 2010, European Association of Social Anthropologists.
 Pałasz-Rutkowska, Ewa & Andrzej T. Romer, "Polish-Japanese co-operation during World War II" in Japan Forum No. 7, 1995.
 
 

 
 
 Sugihara Seishiro & Norman Hu (2001), Chiune Sugihara and Japan's Foreign Ministry : Between Incompetence and Culpability, University Press of America. 
 Sugihara Yukiko (1995), Visas for Life, translation by Hiroki Sugihara and Anne Hoshiko Akabori, Edu-Comm Plus Editors, 
 Taniuchi Yutaka (2001), The miraculous visas – Chiune Sugihara and the story of the 6000 Jews, New York: Gefen Books. 
 Watanabe Takesato (1999), "The Revisionist Fallacy in The Japanese Media 1 – Case Studies of Denial of Nazi Gas Chambers and NHK's Report on Japanese & Jews Relations" in Social Sciences Review, Doshisha University, No. 59.
 "Lithuania at the beginning of WWII"

External links

 The Chiune Sugihara Memorial Hall in Yaotsu Town
 NPO Chiune Sugihara. Visas For Life Foundation in Japan
 Jewish Virtual Library: Chiune and Yukiko Sugihara
 Revisiting the Sugihara Story from Holocaust Survivors and Remembrance Project: "Forget You Not"
 Immortal Chaplains Foundation Prize for Humanity 2000 (awarded to Sugihara in 2000)
 Foreign Ministry says no disciplinary action for "Japan's Schindler"
 Foreign Ministry honors Chiune Sugihara by setting his Commemorative Plaque (10 October 2000)
 Chiune Sempo Sugihara – Righteous Among the Nations – Yad Vashem
 United States Holocaust Memorial Museum – Online Exhibition  Chiune (Sempo) Sugihara
 
 Sugihara Museum in Kaunas, Lithuania
 Interview Nobuki Sugihara

1900 births
1986 deaths
People of the Empire of Japan
Japanese people of World War II
Japanese diplomats
Japanese expatriates in Lithuania
Japanese expatriates in the Soviet Union
People from Gifu Prefecture
Japanese Righteous Among the Nations
The Holocaust in Lithuania
Eastern Orthodox Righteous Among the Nations
Eastern Orthodox Christians from Japan
Converts to Eastern Orthodoxy
Waseda University alumni
Commanders with Star of the Order of Polonia Restituta
Commanders of the Order of Merit of the Republic of Poland
Japan–Lithuania relations
Jewish Japanese history
Japanese consuls